Lightwoods Park is a public park in Bearwood in the West Midlands, England. It lies on the north-west side of Hagley Road, which here forms the boundary between Birmingham and the borough of Sandwell.

History of Lightwoods House

The park was historically the grounds of Lightwoods House, an 18th-century house, much altered in the 19th century.  The house is a Grade II listed building.

The house was built by Jonathan Grundy in June 1780 and he was its first occupant, living there until his death in 1803. The house was later bought by local soap manufacturer George Adkins in 1865 who passed it down to his son, Caleb.
In 1902, following the death of Caleb Adkins, the house and grounds were put up for sale, with the risk that it would be demolished for building houses on the estate.  A. M. Chance led a committee which by public subscription purchased the estate and handed it over to Birmingham  Corporation as a public park.  By 1905, further public subscriptions enabled more land to be bought and added to the park

The bandstand and other features have the Birmingham City crest with the motto, "Birmingham Forward" in recognition of the ownership of the park by Birmingham City Corporation.

in 1971, Lightwoods House was converted into studios and offices for Hardman company, which made stained glass windows, they vacated in 2008.  In 2010, by agreement between the two Councils, Lightwoods Park was handed over to Sandwell MBC.

In 2015 it was announced that the decaying building would be restored. £1.6 million of funding would be provided by Sandwell MBC and £3.9 million from Heritage Lottery Fund and Big Lottery Fund. Fairhurst Ward Abbots have been appointed as contractors for the works. Work was completed in 2016, with the house being brought back into use with a cafe, and for community events, weddings and conferences, and restoring the surrounding park including the drinking fountains, bandstand, Shakespeare Garden, walls, railings and pond.

Present day
The park features a skateboard ramp and bowling green. It also has a walled garden called "The Shakespeare Garden" with benches, ponds and flower beds. The Garden contains a plaque for the royal gardener John Tradescant the Younger, placed there in 2012 to commemorate the Diamond Jubilee of Elizabeth II. The bandstand is a Grade II listed building.

For about 100 years until November 2010 the park, although lying just outside the Birmingham city limits, was managed by Birmingham Corporation (later the City Council).  The bandstand has railings bearing the Coat of arms of Birmingham, and the drinking fountain also has City of Birmingham inscriptions. In 2010 management of the park was transferred to Sandwell Metropolitan Borough Council.

References

External links

 Official website

Parks and open spaces in the West Midlands (county)
Smethwick